The Dome, subtitled consecutively "A Quarterly Containing Examples of All the Arts" and "An Illustrated Monthly Magazine and Review", was a literary periodical associated with the "Nineties" scene, edited by Ernest J. Oldmeadow, publisher and manager of The Unicorn Press based in London at 7 Cecil Court. It ran for three years, from March 1897 to July 1900. It is usually considered to be the last more or less successful attempt to deliver a valuable literary magazine with a considerable circulation, yet working from an Aestheticist rationale, according to Walter Pater's concepts.

Even more than its decadent movement predecessors The Yellow Book (published 1884–97) and The Savoy (1896), The Dome dealt with both visual and verbal art, and it also covered music and theatre. It was known for its in-depth studies of painters which rose above the level of mere appreciations, and often championed promising talents such as Edward Elgar.

Notable contributors 
Laurence Binyon - a story "The Paralytic" (No. 4, 1898)
Lucas Cranach - woodcuts "The Annunciation", "A Saxon Prince on Horseback" (No. 2, 1897)
Edward Gordon Craig
Campbell Dodgson
Albert Dürer - an engraving "St. Hubert" (No. 2, 1897)

Edward Elgar -  a piano solo Minuet (No. 2, 1897); a song Love alone will stay (No. 4, 1898)
Roger Fry
Althea Gyles – illustrations, including "Aided Cloinne Uisnigh" (The Violent Death of the Children of Uisnigh), 1897
Hiroshige - a colour print "The Wave" (No. 4, 1898)
Hokusai - a print "Fuji through Rain" (No. 4, 1898)
Laurence Housman - stories "The Troubling of the Waters" (No. 2, 1897); "Little Saint Michael" (No. 4, 1898)
Liza Lehmann - a song "Aus Mirza Schaffy" (No. 2, 1897)
Will G. Mein
Alice Meynell
G. B. Piranesi - drawings and etchings (No. 4, 1898)
D. G. Rossetti - a painting "The Sea-Spell" (No. 2, 1897)
Martin Schongauer
William Strang
Arthur Symons 
Francis Thompson
Ethel Rolt Wheeler
William Butler Yeats - a poem "The Desire of Man and of Woman" (No. 2, 1897)

Bibliography 
Darcy, Cornelius P. "The Dome" in British Literary Magazines: The Victorian and Edwardian Age, 1837-1913. Ed. Alvin Sullivan. London: Greenwood Press (1984)
Jackson, Jeffrey B. and Dana L. Jemison, eds. The Dome: Complete Index, 1897-1900. San Francisco, Calif.: Quat'z'Arts Press, 2007.

External links 
The Dome: A Quarterly Containing Examples of All the Arts at The Modernist Journals Project: searchable digital edition of series 1 (March 1897 - May 1898). PDFs of these five issues can be downloaded for free from the MJP website.
Jeffrey B. Jackson, Dana Jemison, A Complete Index to the Dome at berkeley.edu

1897 establishments in the United Kingdom
1900 disestablishments in the United Kingdom
Quarterly magazines published in the United Kingdom
Defunct literary magazines published in the United Kingdom
Magazines published in London
Magazines established in 1897
Magazines disestablished in 1900